Stephen J. "Steve" Poulter  (born 18 February 1961, in Whalley, Lancashire) is a retired British swimmer.

Swimming career
Poulter competed at the 1980 and 1984 Olympics.

He represented England and won a silver medal in the 400 metres individual medley, at the 1982 Commonwealth Games in Brisbane, Queensland, Australia. Four years later he represented England and won a bronze medal in the 400 metres individual medley, at the 1986 Commonwealth Games in Edinburgh, Scotland. He also won the 1981 and 1982 ASA National British Championships title in the 400 metres medley and the 1981 200 metres butterfly title.

See also
 List of Commonwealth Games medallists in swimming (men)

References

English male swimmers
Male butterfly swimmers
Swimmers at the 1980 Summer Olympics
Swimmers at the 1984 Summer Olympics
1961 births
Living people
Olympic swimmers of Great Britain
Commonwealth Games silver medallists for England
Commonwealth Games bronze medallists for England
Swimmers at the 1982 Commonwealth Games
Swimmers at the 1986 Commonwealth Games
Commonwealth Games medallists in swimming
Medallists at the 1982 Commonwealth Games
Medallists at the 1986 Commonwealth Games